St Michael and All Angels Church is a Grade II listed Church of England church in Barnes in the London Borough of Richmond upon Thames. It is located at 39 Elm Bank Gardens, London SW13 0NX.

History
The congregation, founded in 1867, initially met in a building in Archway Street that combined a school and a church. A temporary tin tabernacle was erected next to the school in 1878.

The current building was erected in 1891–93. The architect was Charles Innes, a member of the congregation, who also designed the  additions  to  the nave,  chancel and north aisle of St Mary's Church, Barnes.

A vestry, in a matching style, was added in 1936.

Barbara Pym
The novelist Barbara Pym lived in Barnes from 1949 to 1961. She worshipped at St Michael's, and was a member of the Parochial Church Council. London Anglo-Catholic churches feature prominently in Pym's novels, and St Michael's is the model for the church in her 1955 novel Less Than Angels, where Pym describes High Mass on Whitsunday:

Notable clergy
 Joe Hawes, later Dean of St Edmundsbury, served as priest-in-charge, and then team vicar, from 1996 to 2003
 Bruce Ruddock, later Director of the Anglican Centre in Rome, served as priest-in-charge from 1988 to 1995

References

External links
Official website
 

1867 establishments in England
19th-century Church of England church buildings
Barnes
Barnes
Churches in Barnes, London
Grade II listed churches in the London Borough of Richmond upon Thames